Kochi is home to the Punjabi-speaking Sikh community in Kerala, as the coastal city has the most Sikhs in the south Indian state. The only gurdwara in Kerala is also located in Kochi. Every Sunday and Wednesday, the Sikh families of Kochi assemble at the gurdwara in the city. And after the prayers, they take food from the Guru Ka Langar, the community kitchen.

See also
 Punjabi people
 Sikhism in India

References

Kerala society
Non-Malayali Keralites
Ethnic groups in Kerala
Internal migrations in India
People from Kochi
Sikhism in India